William Henry Forester Denison, 1st Earl of Londesborough (19 June 1834 – 19 April 1900), known as The Lord Londesborough from 1860 to 1887, was a British peer and Liberal politician. He was also one of the main founders of Scarborough FC.

Early life

Londesborough was born on 19 June 1834.  He was the eldest son and heir of Albert Denison, 1st Baron Londesborough, and Henrietta Mary Weld-Forester. Among his siblings was

His paternal grandfather was Henry Conyngham, 1st Marquess Conyngham (his father being the fourth son of the Marquess). His mother was the fourth daughter of Cecil Weld-Forester, 1st Baron Forester, and Lady Katharine Mary Manners (second daughter of Charles Manners, 4th Duke of Rutland).

Career
He was elected to the House of Commons for Beverley in 1857, a seat he held until 1859, and then represented Scarborough from 1859 to 1860 when he succeeded his father in the barony and entered the House of Lords.

In 1887, he was created Viscount Raincliffe, of Raincliffe in the North Riding of the County of York, and Earl of Londesborough, in the County of York. He was appointed Honorary Colonel of the 4th East Riding Artillery Volunteer Corps on 11 August 1860 and of the 1st Yorkshire (East Riding) Rifle Volunteer Corps (later 1st Volunteer Battalion, East Yorkshire Regiment) on 24 April 1862. The Volunteers' drill hall in Hull was named Londesborough Barracks in his honour. He transferred from the 1st Bn to be Hon Col of the 2nd Volunteer Battalion, East Yorkshire Regiment on 9 September 1893.

Earl Londesborough was also the Worshipful Master of the Constitutional Lodge No. 294 in Beverley.

The Earl was also the first President of the British Goat Society established in 1869.

The Earl entertained Edward VII at his villa, Londesborough Lodge at Scarborough in 1871. The 'Londesborough Theatre' (1871-1960) was named in his honour. Both Raincliffe Woods, and the former Raincliffe School, were also named after the title bestowed on him in 1887.

Personal life
In 1863, Lord Londesborough married Lady Edith Frances Wilhelmina Somerset, daughter of Henry Somerset, 7th Duke of Beaufort. Together, they were the parents of:

 William Henry Francis Denison, 2nd Earl of Londesborough (1864–1917), who married Lady Grace Adelaide Fane (1860–1933), eldest daughter of Francis Fane, 12th Earl of Westmorland.
 Lady Edith Henrietta Sybil Denison (d. 1945) married her half-cousin Sir Gerald Codrington, 1st Baronet of Dodington Park (1850-1929), son of Sir Christopher William Codrington.
 Lady Lilian Katharine Selina Denison (d. 1899), who married Newton Charles Ogle of Kirkley (d. 1912).
 Lady Ida Emily Augusta Denison, married Sir George Sitwell, becoming the mother of the three Sitwells, a close-knit trio of authors and social stylists of the 1920s. Lady Ida was an orchid enthusiast and she is commemorated in the scientific name of the orchid Vanda denisoniana.
 Lady Mildred Adelaide Cecilia Denison (d. 1953), who married Sir William Wemyss Cooke, 10th Baronet in 1902. They divorced in 1925.

Lord Londesborough died in April 1900, aged 65, and was succeeded in his titles by his son William. Lady Londesborough died in 1915.

References

External links

 

1834 births
1900 deaths
Earls in the Peerage of the United Kingdom
Eldest sons of British hereditary barons
Denison, William
Denison, William
Denison, William
UK MPs who inherited peerages
UK MPs who were granted peerages
Politicians from Scarborough, North Yorkshire
Denison, William
Liberal Party (UK) MPs for English constituencies
William
Presidents of the Marylebone Cricket Club
Peers of the United Kingdom created by Queen Victoria